Daniel Cifuentes Alfaro (born 13 July 1980), known as Cifu, is a Spanish footballer who plays for Castilleja CF as a right back.

Club career
Cifu was born in Madrid. An unsuccessful graduate of Real Madrid's youth system, he went on to make his professional debut with Zamora CF, spending most of his early career in the Segunda División B.

In the 2005–06 season, Cifu joined Real Sociedad for €450.000, making his La Liga debut on 21 September 2005 and playing the full 90 minutes in the 3–2 home win over Atlético Madrid. Never an important element for the Basques he would be loaned, in January 2007, to Segunda División club SD Ponferradina, and he scored once for his new team, in a 3–3 away draw against UD Salamanca – who led 3–0 at the hour mark – on 1 April; Ponferradina would be, however, relegated.

Cifu signed for Real Valladolid in August 2007. After having featured in only nine matches throughout the campaign, he was released by mutual consent in October of the following year.

In late January 2009, Cifu moved to Cádiz CF, being part of the squad that returned to the second tier after a one-year absence. In the following season he was an undisputed starter (34 games, 33 starts), but the Andalusians would be immediately relegated.

On 21 July 2011, Cifu joined Recreativo de Huelva on a two-year deal. He went on to spend three seasons in the second division with the club, scoring his only goal on 19 October 2013 to help the hosts recover from a three-goal disadvantage against CD Lugo to draw 3–3.

Cifu retired in 2020 at the age of 40, following short spells with Lincoln Red Imps (Gibraltar Premier Division), Zamora, Atlético Mancha Real and Isla Cristina CF. However, he joined Castilleja CF on 25 September 2020.

International career
On 31 December 2017, Cifu announced he would part of the technical staff of the Equatorial Guinean national team for local-based players soon to compete at the 2018 African Nations Championship.

References

External links

Stats and bio at Cadistas1910 

1980 births
Living people
Footballers from Madrid
Spanish footballers
Association football defenders
La Liga players
Segunda División players
Segunda División B players
Tercera División players
Divisiones Regionales de Fútbol players
Real Madrid C footballers
Zamora CF footballers
SD Eibar footballers
Real Sociedad footballers
SD Ponferradina players
Real Valladolid players
Cádiz CF players
Recreativo de Huelva players
Gibraltar Premier Division players
Lincoln Red Imps F.C. players
Spain youth international footballers
Spanish expatriate footballers
Expatriate footballers in Gibraltar
Spanish expatriate sportspeople in Gibraltar
Spanish expatriate sportspeople in Equatorial Guinea